Rockton and Rion Railroad Historic District is a national historic district located near Winnsboro, Fairfield County, South Carolina.  The district encompasses 40 contributing buildings, 6 contributing structures, and 2 contributing objects associated with the quarrying, finishing, and transporting of Winnsboro blue granite.  The district resources were built between about 1883 and about 1945.

The district includes the Anderson and Rion Quarry sites, industrial buildings and structures associated with granite quarrying and finishing operations, residences constructed for management personnel at Anderson Quarry, the Rockton and Rion Railroad line and side tracks, two steam locomotives from the Rockton and Rion Railroad, and a ca. 1941 school building constructed of granite. They are grouped into two complexes, the Anderson Quarry-Phillips Granite Works and the Rion Granite Quarry-Brooks Granite Company.

Most of the buildings and structures in the Historic District were constructed of Winnsboro blue granite, with the majority constructed from the late 1920s to the late 1930s.

It was listed on the National Register of Historic Places in 1984.

Historical Photographs

References

Historic districts on the National Register of Historic Places in South Carolina
Buildings and structures in Fairfield County, South Carolina
National Register of Historic Places in Fairfield County, South Carolina